Goodbye Paradise is a 1983 Australian film directed by Carl Schultz. The plot centres on Queensland's Gold Coast in the early 1980s, when a disgraced former cop, Michael Stacey (Ray Barrett) writes a book exposing police corruption, does an investigation resulting in two murders, exposes a religious cult and watches the army begin a military coup.

Cast
Ray Barrett as Michael Stacy
Paul Chubb as Curly
Guy Doleman as Quiney
Kate Fitzpatrick as Mrs. McCreadie
Lex Marinos as Con
Robyn Nevin as Kate
Don Pascoe as Senator McCredie
Janet Scrivener as Kathy

Production
The idea of doing a Raymond Chandler-type story set on the Gold Coast came from Denny Lawrence. His original idea was to have an ex police officer working as a private investigator who investigated a quasi-religious commune run by a charlatan that ended with the deaths of many of the communes' followers. Then the Jonestown Massacre happened and Lawrence backed away from this idea.

He then pitched the idea to Bob Ellis, who liked it and the two of them agreed to work together. They always envisioned Ray Barrett in the lead role as the private eye Stacey and the three of them got some money from the NSW Film Corporation to go up to Surfers Paradise for a week to research and write the script.

Many of Ray Barrett's characteristics found their way into the character of Stacey. Barrett:
Bob is a great observer, and when I finally read the script, I thought "You bugger; you've observed Barrett!" But I didn't mind. I was flattered because Stacey is a living person. He is a failure, really, but a loveable failure; a kind man at heart. Yet everything's slipped by him and he hasn't achieved the things he's wanted to. The character relates to a lot of people, including myself. Bob's put the finger on it. He's brilliant.
According to Lawrence, he was more interested in a genre piece whereas Ellis tried to incorporate his personal politics, but the collaboration was a successful one and the two men would work again many times in the following years.

The NSW Film Commission wanted Michael Thornhill to direct but he wanted several changes to the script and Ellis and Lawrence insisted that Carl Schultz direct. The movie was shot in the winter of 1981 in and around Surfers Paradise over eight weeks.

The character of Quiney was meant to be played by Anthony Quayle but Guy Doleman was cast instead.

Awards
The film was nominated for 4 AFI Awards, won in the Best Actor in the Lead Role (Ray Barrett) and Best Screenplay, Original or Adapted (Bob Ellis, Denny Lawrence) categories. John Seale won the Cinematographer of the Year award of the Australian Cinematographers Society.

Sequel
Bob Ellis and Denny Lawrence wrote a sequel for the film called Goodbye Adelaide. The plot involved Stacy finishing the book he is writing in the first movie and visiting the Adelaide Festival to promote it, where he is caught up in an attempted defection by a Russian poet. In January 1985 The Age reported the film would be made that year with a budget of $3 million. However, the movie was never made.

References

External links

Goodbye Paradise at Australian Screen Online
Goodbye Paradise at Oz Movies

1983 films
1983 drama films
Australian drama films
Films directed by Carl Schultz
Films produced by Jane Scott
Films scored by Peter Best (composer)
Films set in Queensland
Films shot in Queensland
1980s English-language films